Jalapa is a small city in the Mexican state of Tabasco.

Jalapa also serves as the administrative centre for the surrounding municipality (municipio) of the same name, which covers a total surface area of 642.91 km² and, in the year 2000 census, reported a population of 32,773.

External links
Jalapa municipality (Enciclopedia de los Municipios de México)

Populated places in Tabasco